Peru competed at the 2020 Summer Olympics in Tokyo. Originally scheduled to take place from 24 July to 9 August 2020, the Games were postponed to 23 July to 8 August 2021, because of the COVID-19 pandemic. Since the nation's official debut in 1936, Peruvian athletes have appeared in every edition of the Summer Olympic Games, with the exception of the 1952 Summer Olympics in Helsinki.

Competitors

Athletics

Peruvian athletes further achieved the entry standards, either by qualifying time or by world ranking, in the following track and field events (up to a maximum of 3 athletes in each event):

Track & road events
Men

Women

Badminton

Peru entered one badminton player into the Olympic tournament. Former Youth Olympian Daniela Macías accepted a spare berth from the injured Olympic champion Carolina Marín of Spain, as the next highest-ranked shuttler vying for qualification in the women's singles, based on the BWF World Race to Tokyo Rankings of June 15, 2021. This signifies the country's return to the sport for the first time since 1996.

Boxing

Peru entered two male boxers to compete in each of the following weight classes into the Olympic tournament. With the cancellation of the 2021 Pan American Qualification Tournament in Buenos Aires, Argentina, Leodan Pezo finished among the top five of the men's lightweight category to secure his place in the Peruvian squad based on the IOC's Boxing Task Force Rankings for the Americas. Meanwhile, José Maria Lucar completed the nation's sporting lineup by topping the field of boxers vying for qualification from the Americas in the men's heavyweight category through the same system. This signifies the country's return to the sport for the first time since 1996.

Cycling

Road
Peru entered one rider to compete in the men's Olympic road race for the first time since Los Angeles 1984, by finishing in the top two, not yet qualified, at the 2019 Pan American Championships in Mexico. This signifies the country's debut in the sport.

Fencing

Peru entered one fencer into the Olympic competition. Beijing 2008 Olympian María Luisa Doig claimed a spot in the women's épée by winning the final match at the Pan American Zonal Qualifier in San José, Costa Rica. This signifies the country's return to the sport for the first time since 2008.

Gymnastics

Artistic
Peru entered one artistic gymnast into the Olympic competition. Rio 2016 Olympian Ariana Orrego received a spare berth from the women's apparatus events, as one of the twelve highest-ranked gymnasts, neither part of the team nor qualified directly through the all-around, at the 2019 World Championships in Stuttgart, Germany. This signifies the country's debut in the sport.

Women

Judo
 
Peru qualified one judoka for the men's half-lightweight category (66 kg) at the Games. Rio 2016 Olympian Juan Postigos accepted a continental berth from the Americas as the nation's top-ranked judoka outside of direct qualifying position in the IJF World Ranking List of June 28, 2021.

Karate
 
Peru entered one karateka into the inaugural Olympic tournament. Alexandra Grande  secured a place in the women's kumite 61-kg category, as the highest-ranked karateka vying for qualification from the Americas based on the WKD Olympic Rankings.

Rowing

Peru qualified one boat in the men's single sculls for the Games by finishing fifth in the A-final and securing the second of five berths available at the 2021 FISA Americas Olympic Qualification Regatta in Rio de Janeiro, Brazil.

Qualification Legend: FA=Final A (medal); FB=Final B (non-medal); FC=Final C (non-medal); FD=Final D (non-medal); FE=Final E (non-medal); FF=Final F (non-medal); SA/B=Semifinals A/B; SC/D=Semifinals C/D; SE/F=Semifinals E/F; QF=Quarterfinals; R=Repechage

Sailing

Peruvian sailors qualified one boat in each of the following classes through the 2018 Sailing World Championships, the class-associated Worlds, the 2019 Pan American Games, and the continental regattas.

M = Medal race; EL = Eliminated – did not advance into the medal race

Shooting

Peruvian shooters achieved quota places for the following events by virtue of their best finishes at the 2018 ISSF World Championships, the 2019 ISSF World Cup series, the 2019 Pan American Games, and Championships of the Americas, as long as they obtained a minimum qualifying score (MQS) by May 31, 2020.

Skateboarding

Peru entered one skateboarder into the Olympic tournament. Angelo Caro Narvaez was automatically selected among the top 16 eligible skateboarders in the men's street based on the World Skate Olympic Rankings of June 30, 2021.

Surfing

Peru sent four surfers (two per gender) to compete in their respective races at the Games. Lucca Mesinas, Miguel Tudela, and Daniella Rosas secured the places on the Peruvian roster in the men's and women's shortboard races, respectively, with a top-two finish of their preliminary heats at the 2021 ISA World Surfing Games in El Salvador, while 2004 world champion Sofía Mulánovich accepted a spare berth previously allocated by Japan's Shino Matsuda, as the next highest-ranked surfer in the overall provisional rankings at the 2019 ISA World Surfing Games.

Swimming

Peru received a universality invitation from FINA to send two top-ranked swimmers (one per gender) in their respective individual events to the Olympics, based on the FINA Points System of June 28, 2021.

Tennis

Peru entered one tennis player into the Olympic tournament for the first time since Athens 2004. Following the late withdrawals of several tennis players, Juan Pablo Varillas (world no. 133) accepted a spare berth previously allocated by one of the original top 56 entrants to compete in the men's singles based on the ATP Entry Rankings of June 14, 2021.

Weightlifting

Peru entered one male weightlifter into the Olympic competition. Marcos Rojas accepted a spare berth unused by the Tripartite Commission as the next highest-ranked weightlifter vying for qualification in the men's 61 kg category based on the IWF Absolute World Rankings.

Wrestling

Peru qualified one wrestler for the men's freestyle 86 kg into the Olympic competition, by progressing to the top two finals at the 2020 Pan American Qualification Tournament in Ottawa, Canada.

Freestyle

See also
 Peru at the 2019 Pan American Games
 Peru at the 2020 Summer Paralympics

References

Nations at the 2020 Summer Olympics
2020
2021 in Peruvian sport